Haji Baba Sheikh was the Kurdish prime minister of the Republic of Mahabad. After the republic was conquered by the Iranian army in 1947, unlike Qazi Muhammad, he was not executed. He was immune because of his religious standing. The journalist and lyric Hemin Mukriyani was his secretary during the republic.

Literature
 Archie Roosevelt, Jr., "The Kurdish Republic of Mahabad", Middle East Journal, no. 1 (July 1947), pp. 247–269

Republic of Mahabad
Iranian Kurdish people
Iranian Kurdish politicians
Prime ministers
Democratic Party of Iranian Kurdistan politicians